Dragon Age is a role-playing game published by Green Ronin Publishing in 2010. It is based on the Dragon Age video game series by BioWare, and uses the video game series' setting.

Description
The game uses traditional tabletop role playing game features, such as character classes (fighter, mage and rogue), races (human, dwarf or elf), and ability scores. Gameplay in the system centers around the use of three six-sided dice for all rolls. One die, called the "dragon die", is differently colored than the other two. When doubles appear on any roll, the player can perform special actions called "stunts", based on the value on the dragon die.

Publication history
The game was released on January 25, 2010. Chris Pramas designed the simple class-and-level system for the game.

The game's initial release was as a boxed set including a Player's Guide, Game Master's Guide, map of Ferelden and three dice, and covered characters of levels 1 through 5. Second and third sets, covering levels 6–10 and 11–20 respectively were later released. A single hardcover compilation of the rules was released in May 2015.

Faces of Thedas, a sourcebook dedicated to porting series elements that could not fit in the main volume, such as a variety of companion and non playable characters from the Dragon Age video games, was released on April 9, 2019.

Reception
Marshall Lemon, in his 2015 review written for The Escapist, praised The Dragon Age Core Rulebook, commenting "Green Ronin's Dragon Age isn't just a fantastic RPG adaptation, it's an excellent game period. It doesn't matter if you're a veteran tabletop player, a BioWare fan, or a complete newcomer to gaming. Dragon Age is a wonderful tabletop RPG that absolutely deserves your attention."

Lemon reviewed the Faces of Thedas sourcebook for VG247 in 2019. He noted that it is not an essential product for game masters working from the core book, though he recognized that fans of the Dragon Age video games will relish the "opportunity to interact with fan-favorite characters", and that the relationship rules can encourage roleplay opportunities for new players”

Awards
The Dragon Age Core Rulebook was awarded the Gold Winner for Best Game and Best Art, Interior for the 2016 ENnie Tabletop RPG Awards.

References

Dragon Age
ENnies winners
Fantasy role-playing games
Green Ronin Publishing games
Role-playing games based on video games
Role-playing games introduced in 2010